A list of films produced by the Tollywood (Bengali language film industry) based in Kolkata in the year 1980.

A-Z of films

References

 http://www.bangdarshan.com - samaj - chalachchitra

1980
Lists of 1980 films by country or language
Films, Bengali